Sarab (also Romanized as Sarāb) is a village in Taghamin Rural District, Korani District, Bijar County, Kurdistan Province, Iran. , its population was 337, in 85 families. The village is populated by Azerbaijanis.

References 

Towns and villages in Bijar County
Azerbaijani settlements in Kurdistan Province